The 1931 East Tennessee State Teachers football team was an American football team that East Tennessee State Teacher's College, Johnson City—now known as East Tennessee State University (ETSU)—as a member of the Smoky Mountain Conference in the 1931 college football season. They were led by second-year head coach Jack S. Batey, who was a graduate of Middle Tennessee State Normal School (B.S.) and University of Tennessee (M.S.). He coached football and basketball for two years and baseball for six years and taught physical education and agriculture from 1930 to 1935 at the school. It was Batey's final year of coaching football at the school.

Schedule

References

East Tennessee State Teachers
East Tennessee State Buccaneers football seasons
East Tennessee State Teachers football